Armand Loreau (born 30 July 1931) is a French sprint canoer who competed in the early 1950s. He won two silver medals at the 1950 ICF Canoe Sprint World Championships, earning them in the C-2 1000 m and C-2 10000 m events. Loreau also finished fourth in the C-2 1000 m event at the 1952 Summer Olympics in Helsinki.

References

Sports-reference.com Armand Loreau's profile at Sports Reference.com

External links
 

1931 births
Possibly living people
Canoeists at the 1952 Summer Olympics
French male canoeists
Olympic canoeists of France
ICF Canoe Sprint World Championships medalists in Canadian